Pablo Guerrero Bonilla (born 20 March 1992) is a Spanish cyclist, who most recently rode for UCI ProTeam .

Major results
2015
 1st Road race, Andalusia Road Championships
 1st Stage 3 Volta a Coruña
2018
 1st Time Trial, Andalusia Road Championships
 2nd Overall Vuelta a Zamora
 10th Overall Tour Cycliste International de la Guadeloupe 
2019
 1st  Marathon, National Mountain bike Championships
2020
 1st  Mountains classification Troféu Joaquim Agostinho

References

External links

1992 births
Living people
Spanish male cyclists
Sportspeople from the Province of Málaga
Cyclists from Andalusia